"Battle Cry" is a song recorded by American rapper Angel Haze featuring Australian singer-songwriter Sia. It was released as the second single from Haze's debut album, Dirty Gold, on January 9, 2014. The song was produced by Greg Kurstin.

Music video
An official music video for the song, directed by Frank Borin, was released on Haze's official Vevo account on February 14, 2014. The music video was nominated for Best Video with a Social Message at the 2014 MTV Video Music Awards.

Credits and personnel 
Credits adapted from Tidal.

 Angel Haze – writer, vocals
 Sia Furler – writer, vocals
 Greg Kurstin – writer, producer, bass guitar, drums, guitar, keyboards, piano, recording engineer
 Jesse Shatkin – recording engineer
 Alex Pasco – recording engineer
 Manny Marroquin – mixer
 Chris Gehringer – mastering engineer

Track listing
 Remixes EP
 "Battle Cry (MK Remix)" – 8:25
 "Battle Cry (Levi Lennox Remix) – 4:07
 "Battle Cry (Yumi And the Weather Remix)" – 4:26
 "Battle Cry (Kudu Blue Remix)" – 4:18

Charts

References

External links
 
 

Sia (musician) songs
2014 singles
2014 songs
Hip hop songs
Songs written by Sia (musician)
Songs written by Greg Kurstin
Island Records singles
Song recordings produced by Greg Kurstin
Republic Records singles